Sergio Tu (born 24 February 1997) is a Taiwanese professional road cyclist, who currently rides for UCI WorldTeam .

Major results
2016
 1st  Time trial, National Road Championships
2017
 5th Time trial, Asian Under-23 Road Championships
2019
 2nd  Time trial, Asian Under-23 Road Championships
2020
 1st  Time trial, National Road Championships
2021
 1st  Time trial, National Road Championships

References

External links

1997 births
Living people
Taiwanese male cyclists